Rennervations  is an upcoming American  Documentary mini- series created by Zach Merck  for Disney+. The series will premiere on April 12, 2023, with all 4 episodes.

Cast 
Jeremy Renner as Himself
Anthony Mackie as Himself
Vanessa Hudgens as Herself
Anil Kapoor as Himself
Sebastián Yatra as Himself

References

External links
 

2020s American documentary television series
2023 American television series debuts